James Ronald Horn (born November 20, 1940) is an American saxophonist, woodwind player, and session musician.

Biography
Horn was born in Los Angeles, and after replacing saxophonist Steve Douglas in 1959, he toured with member Duane Eddy for five years, playing sax and flute on the road, and in the recording studio. Along with Bobby Keys and Jim Price he became one of the most in-demand horn session players of the 1970s and 1980s.

Horn played on solo albums by three members of the Beatles, forming a long association with George Harrison after appearing at the latter's Concert for Bangladesh benefit in 1971. Horn toured with John Denver on and off from 1978 to 1993. He also played with Denver in concert occasionally after the Wildlife Concert in 1995.

He played flute on the original studio recording of "Going Up the Country" by Canned Heat, reproduced in the film Woodstock.
Horn played flute and saxophone on the Beach Boys' album Pet Sounds, and played flute on the Rolling Stones' album Goats Head Soup.
Horn also collaborated with Don Williams on at least two songs and toured with Williams for two years.

In 2007, Horn was inducted into the Musicians Hall of Fame and Museum in Nashville as a member of the Wrecking Crew.

Artists with whom Horn has collaborated

 The 5th Dimension – "Up, Up and Away", "Aquarius/Let the Sunshine In"
 Aaron Neville
 Alan James – "Sweet Baby You", "Where It's At" on album Break The Ice (1991)
 Badfinger - Badfinger
 Barbra Streisand
 The Beach Boys – Pet Sounds – "Good Vibrations"
 Billy Joel
 Boz Scaggs – Memphis
 Buffalo Springfield – "Broken Arrow" (clarinet)
 Burton Cummings – "My Own Way to Rock" (Saxophone)
 Canned Heat – "Going Up the Country" (flute)
 Captain & Tennille  – Song of Joy – "1954 Boogie Blues"
 The Carpenters – Carpenters
 Chi Coltrane
 Christopher Cross – "Ride Like the Wind"
 David Gates
 Deborah Allen
 Delaney & Bonnie
 Delbert McClinton – Never Been Rocked Enough
 Diana Ross
 Dizzy Gillespie – Free Ride
 Duane Eddy
 Elton John – "Little Jeannie" (alto)
 Elvis Presley – "Roustabout" (film)
 Frank Sinatra – "Strangers in the Night" (flute)
 Garth Brooks – "One Night a Day"
 George Benson – "Turn Your Love Around"
 George Harrison – 1971 The Concert for Bangladesh – 1974 Dark Horse Tour – "Cloud Nine" – "Got My Mind Set On You"– 1975 Extra Texture – "You".
 Glenn Frey – "The One You Love" (ending tenor saxophone solo)
 Hank Williams, Jr. – "Monday Night Football Theme" – BORN TO BOOGIE
 Harry Chapin
 Harry Nilsson – Pussy Cats
 Herbie Hancock – "Man-Child"
 Ike and Tina Turner - "River Deep – Mountain High" (baritone)
 Jeff Lynne – Armchair Theatre
 Jim Salestrom
 John Denver
 Johnny Rivers – "Poor Side of Town"
 Joni Mitchell
 Jose Feliciano – "Light My Fire" and LP Feliciano!
 Joy of Cooking – Castles
 Kenny Chesney – , Horn is on tour with Kenny Chesney's Sun Carnival Tour. Horn has composed and arranged the horn sections for Chesney for the past several years.
 Leon Russell – "Lady Blue"
 Linda Ronstadt
 Lionel Richie
 Little Richard
 The Mamas & the Papas – notably "Creeque Alley"
 Michael Jackson
 Mink DeVille – Sportin' Life
 Molly Hatchet - The Deed Is Done
 Monk Higgins - Extra Soul Perception
 Neil Sedaka – Sedaka's Back
 Paul McCartney
 Pete Huttlinger
 Ringo Starr – "Don't Go Where the Road Don't Go"
 Rita Coolidge
 Ronnie Milsap – Lost in the Fifties Tonight
 Roy Orbison
 Seals & Crofts – Summer Breeze
 Shawn Phillips – "Italian Phases" (soprano saxophone)
 Shooter Jennings – Played and arranged horns on album "The Wolf" (2007)
 Spiral Starecase – "More Today Than Yesterday" (baritone)
 Steely Dan – The Royal Scam
 Steve Cropper and Booker T. & the M.G.'s – MEMPHIS (with Kioshiro) – 1992 Tour
 Steve Taylor – "I Blew Up the Clinic Real Good"
 Stevie Wonder "Ebony Eyes"
 The Righteous Brothers – "You've Lost That Lovin' Feelin" (baritone)
 The Rolling Stones – Goat's Head Soup
 Tom Petty
 Toto – "Rosanna", "Africa"
 Traveling Wilburys – Volume 1, Volume 3
 Van Dyke Parks – Song Cycle
 Vince Gill – "I Can't Tell You Why"
 Warren Zevon – Excitable Boy (tenor)
 Wynonna

Studio albums
 Through the Eyes of a Horn (1972) Shelter Records
 Jim's Horns (1973) Shelter Records
 Neon Nights (1989) Warner Bros Records
 Work It Out (1990)
 Children of the Universe (2012) self-released, CD Baby

References

External links
Jim Horn Interview NAMM Oral History Library (2017)

Living people
American male saxophonists
American rock saxophonists
Musicians from Los Angeles
The Wrecking Crew (music) members
1940 births
American flautists
American clarinetists
American oboists
Male oboists
American bassoonists
American session musicians
21st-century American saxophonists
21st-century clarinetists
21st-century American male musicians
21st-century flautists